Martin Haar (born 2 May 1952) is a Dutch football coach and a former defender. He is an assistant coach with Jong AZ.

Haar was born in Zwolle, Overijssel. He played for Go Ahead Eagles (1971–1977), HFC Haarlem (1977–1983), AZ '67 (1983–1986), HFC Haarlem (1986–1988), Sparta Rotterdam (1988–1989) and FC Wageningen (1989). He was a member of the famous Haarlem team, that competed in the UEFA Cup in the 1982–83 season, for the first time in the club's history. However this campaign was to be overshadowed by the Luzhniki disaster.

References
 
  Profile

1952 births
Sportspeople from Zwolle
Footballers from Overijssel
Living people
Association football midfielders
Dutch footballers
Dutch football managers
AZ Alkmaar managers
AZ Alkmaar players
HFC Haarlem players
Go Ahead Eagles players
Sparta Rotterdam players
FC Wageningen players
Eredivisie players
Eerste Divisie players
Eerste Divisie managers
Dutch expatriate football managers
Expatriate football managers in Austria
Dutch expatriate sportspeople in Austria